Mikey Lewis (born 4 July 2001) is a professional rugby league footballer who plays as a  and  for Hull Kingston Rovers in the Betfred Super League.

He has spent time on loan from Hull KR at the Newcastle Thunder and York City Knights in Betfred Championship.

Playing career

Hull KR
In 2019 he made his Hull Kingston Rovers Super League début against the Wigan Warriors.

Lewis made a total of 12 appearances for Hull KR in the 2021 Super League season including the club's 28-10 semi-final loss against Catalans Dragons.
Before the start of the semi-final, Sky Sports pundit Phil Clarke compared Lewis's 2021 season to Benji Marshall's 2005 season with the Wests Tigers.

In round 18 of the 2022 Super League season, Lewis scored a hat-trick for Hull KR in their 34-28 defeat against arch-rivals Hull F.C. at Magic Weekend.

York City Knights
On 12 May 2021 it was reported that he had signed for the York City Knights in the RFL Championship on one month loan.

References

External links
Hull KR profile
SL profile

2001 births
Living people
England Knights national rugby league team players
English rugby league players
Rugby league halfbacks
Rugby league players from Kingston upon Hull
Hull Kingston Rovers players
Newcastle Thunder players
York City Knights players